Lloyd Hibbert (born 29 June 1959 in Birmingham) is an English professional light welter/welter/light middleweight boxer of the 1970s and '80s who won the British Boxing Board of Control (BBBofC) British light middleweight, and Commonwealth light middleweight title, and was a challenger for the BBBofC Midlands Area light middleweight title against Cliff Gilpin, his professional fighting weight varied from , i.e. light welterweight to , i.e. light middleweight.

References

External links

Image - Lloyd Hibbert

1959 births
English male boxers
Light-middleweight boxers
Light-welterweight boxers
Living people
Boxers from Birmingham, West Midlands
Welterweight boxers